Fred Koenig (August 11, 1871 – January 25, 1950) was an American wrestler. He competed in the men's freestyle lightweight at the 1904 Summer Olympics.

References

External links
 

1871 births
1950 deaths
American male sport wrestlers
Olympic wrestlers of the United States
Wrestlers at the 1904 Summer Olympics
Sportspeople from Missouri